Ljubiša Dunđerski (also transliterated Dundjerski; born 26 May 1972) is a Serbian former professional footballer who played as a midfielder.

Dunđerski made a name for himself at Vojvodina, before transferring to Atalanta in 1997. He spent seven years in Italy, also playing for Como and Treviso, before returning to Vojvodina in 2004.

In 2015, Dunđerski served as the director of football at his former club Vojvodina.

On December 18, 2016, he became sports director of FK Spartak Subotica.

Managerial statistics

References

External links
 
 
 

Association football midfielders
Atalanta B.C. players
Como 1907 players
Expatriate footballers in Italy
Treviso F.B.C. 1993 players
FK Borac Čačak players
RFK Novi Sad 1921 players
FK Vojvodina players
People from Doboj
Serbia and Montenegro expatriate footballers
Serbia and Montenegro footballers
Serbia and Montenegro expatriate sportspeople in Italy
Serbia and Montenegro international footballers
Serbian First League players
Serbian footballers
Serbs of Bosnia and Herzegovina
Serie A players
Serie B players
1972 births
Living people